The 2018 Bojangles' Southern 500, the 69th running of the event was a Monster Energy NASCAR Cup Series race held on September 2, 2018, at Darlington Raceway in Darlington, South Carolina. Contested over 367 laps on the  egg-shaped oval, it was the 25th race of the 2018 Monster Energy NASCAR Cup Series season. This race marked the final career start for Kasey Kahne.

Report

Background

Darlington Raceway is a race track built for NASCAR racing located near Darlington, South Carolina. It is nicknamed "The Lady in Black" and "The Track Too Tough to Tame" by many NASCAR fans and drivers and advertised as "A NASCAR Tradition." It is of a unique, somewhat egg-shaped design, an oval with the ends of very different configurations, a condition which supposedly arose from the proximity of one end of the track to a minnow pond the owner refused to relocate. This situation makes it very challenging for the crews to set up their cars' handling in a way that is effective at both ends.

Entry list

Practice

First practice

Final practice

Qualifying

Qualifying results

Race

Stage Results

Stage 1
Laps: 100

Stage 2
Laps: 100

Final Stage Results

Stage 3
Laps: 167

Race statistics
 Lead changes: 5 among different drivers
 Cautions/Laps: 6 for 35
 Red flags: 0
 Time of race: 3 hours, 48 minutes and 54 seconds
 Average speed:

Media

Television
NBC Sports covered the race on the television side. Steve Letarte, two–time Darlington winner Jeff Burton and Dale Earnhardt Jr. had the call in the booth for the race. Rick Allen, three-time Darlington winner Dale Jarrett and Kyle Petty called from the NBC Peacock Pit Box on pit road. Jarrett and Petty also join Earnhardt in the booth for a portion of the race. Dave Burns, Parker Kligerman, Marty Snider and Kelli Stavast reported from pit lane during the race.

Radio
The Motor Racing Network had the radio call for the race, which was simulcast on Sirius XM NASCAR Radio. Dave Moody called the race from a Billboard outside of turn when the field raced through turns 1 and 2, and Mike Bagley had the call of the race atop of the Darlington Raceway Club outside of turn 3 when the field raced through turns 3 and 4

Standings after the race

Drivers' Championship standings

Manufacturers' Championship standings

Note: Only the first 16 positions are included for the driver standings.
. – Driver has clinched a position in the Monster Energy NASCAR Cup Series playoffs.

References

2018 Monster Energy NASCAR Cup Series
Historically themed events
NASCAR races at Darlington Raceway
September 2018 sports events in the United States
2018 in sports in South Carolina